Roger Mayorga (10 July 1946 – 5 October 2019) was a Nicaraguan football goalkeeper.

Club career
Regarded as the finest of Nicaraguan goalkeepers alongside Salvador Dubois, Mayorga played his club football for Club Dinamo, Rincon Espanol, Milca Roja and Flor de Caña FC in his homeland Nicaragua and spent time abroad playing for América de Cali in Colombia, Águila in El Salvador and Aurora in Guatemala.

Honduras
He had a lengthy spell with F.C. Motagua, for whom he would play 123 games, and played for Universidad, Marathón and Super Estrella de Danlí in Honduras. He retired aged 38.

He holds the record of most successive clean sheets in the Honduran league, 10 matches without a goal conceded between 22 February 1976 and 9 May 1976.

Record
Mayorga maintains a record of 838 minutes without conceiving a goal playing for F.C. Motagua in 1976.

Personal life
His parents were Bienvenida Mayorga and Julio Gutiérrez. He lived with his family in Arizona, with family in NY.  He died on 5 October 2019 in Managua at the age of 73 due to a heart attack.

External links
 Profile - Manfut

References

1946 births
2019 deaths
Sportspeople from Managua
Association football goalkeepers
Nicaraguan men's footballers
Nicaragua international footballers
América de Cali footballers
Aurora F.C. players
C.D. Águila footballers
F.C. Motagua players
C.D. Marathón players
Nicaraguan expatriate footballers
Expatriate footballers in Colombia
Expatriate footballers in Guatemala
Expatriate footballers in El Salvador
Expatriate footballers in Honduras
Nicaraguan expatriate sportspeople in Colombia
Nicaraguan expatriate sportspeople in El Salvador
Nicaraguan expatriate sportspeople in Guatemala
Nicaraguan expatriate sportspeople in Honduras
Liga Nacional de Fútbol Profesional de Honduras players
Categoría Primera A players